Football Superstar is an Australian reality television series that aired on FOX8. It was hosted by Lee Furlong and Brian McFadden, with Kris Smith replacing McFadden in the third season.  The show aimed to find a new football (soccer) star from male contestants aged 16 to 21. In its three seasons, the winners were Adam Hett, Luke Pilkington and Liam McCormick.

Season One (2008)

The first series aired between 19 June 2008 and 7 August 2008, and had an initial first-season run of 8 episodes. The series was hosted by Brian McFadden with former Australian Women's player Amy Taylor co-hosting. The winner was Adam Hett from Perth who beat out Evan Christodoulou in the final. Hett scored a contract under Australian association football club, Sydney FC. He started playing immediately for Sydney FC in the 2008–2009 season of the new 8 team A-League National Youth League. The team was coached by Steve O'Connor. Hett also won a one-year sports scholarship with Macquarie University.
The series was co-funded by Kellogg's Nutri-Grain and FOXTEL at the instigation of Mindshare Australia's Adam Ross.

Contestants

(Ages stated are at commencement of airing)

Eliminated

Aleksander Milisavljevic, 17, Sydney
Oscar Sanchez, 17, Adelaide, South Australia
Christopher Roulston, 17, Brisbane, Queensland
Rhys Giovenali, 17, Sydney
Tom Cullen, 16, Perth, Western Australia
Carlo Coelho, 17, Perth, Western Australia
William Dixon, 18, Melbourne
Alexander Sopina, 18, Sydney
Calum O'Connell, 19, Perth, Western Australia
Zachary Tung, 19, Brisbane, Queensland
David Price, 19, Perth, Western Australia
Corey Slevin, 19, Brisbane, Queensland

Finalists

Reno Damianou, 19, Melbourne
Evan Christodoulou, 17, Melbourne

Winner

Adam Hett, 17, Sydney, NSW

Season Two (2009)

In March 2009 a second series was announced. The winner of the contract to Melbourne Victory was Luke Pilkington. The producers were offering, as a major prize open to any permanent resident of Australia aged between 16 and 20 years of age, a contract with the Melbourne Victory organisation for season 5 of the A-League. Lee Furlong co-hosted with Brian McFadden.

Trial days were held in all mainland state capitals beginning on 22 March in Perth and ending in Melbourne on 19 April. Intending trialists had to submit an audition form and a short video before being invited to attend the one-day trials.

Ten players were selected on merit from each of the trials and invited to attend an intensive training camp in Melbourne over a weekend in late April. Fifteen players from the weekend camp were then selected for an all expenses paid month long training camp under the supervision of Melbourne Victory staff as well as play competitive matches against local teams whilst living as a group in a house in Melbourne.

As with the 2008 series the hopeful participants where culled from the groups at each level using both objective and subjective criteria.

Contestants

(Ages stated are at commencement of airing)

Eliminated

Kynon Melling, 18, Perth, Western Australia
Michael Marchi, 20, Adelaide, South Australia
Thomas Renzi, 19, Mount Gambier, South Australia
Daniel Mitwali, 17, Sydney
John Lazaridis, 20, Melbourne
Tom Cullen, 16, Perth
Trent Wood, 19, Perth, Western Australia
Matthew Heath, 19, Brisbane, Queensland
Gilly Buckley, 20, Sydney
Sebastian Petralito, 20, Brisbane, Queensland
Steven Topalovic, 18, Melbourne
David McMurray, 19, Sydney

Finalists

Chris Kozionas, 20, Brisbane, Queensland
Jack Petrie, 20, Brisbane, Queensland

Winner
 Luke Pilkington, 19, Canberra, ACT

Season Three (2010)
Foxtel confirmed a third season of the show during the Melbourne Victory vs Sydney FC game on 7 March 2010. The Major Prize was a contract with Brisbane Roar. Auditions started in late March.
The show returned in June with Furlong co hosting with Kris Smith, a former rugby player, model and partner of Dannii Minogue.  Roar manager Ange Postecoglou was head coach. The winner of the Brisbane Roar contract was Liam McCormick.

Eliminated

(Ages stated are at commencement of airing)

Jeremy Walker, 16, Taroona, Tasmania (Episode 3)
Nicholas Krousoratis, 16, Templestowe, Victoria (Episode 3)
Phillipe Bernabo-Madrid, 18, Mawson, Australian Capital Territory (Episode 4)
Jesse Fuller, 19, Bunbury, Western Australia (Episode 4)
Ahmed Yakoub, 19, Modbury, South Australia (Episode 4)
Alessandro Stazio, 18, Sandringham, Victoria (Episode 5)
Jesse McDonnell, 17, Lennox Head, New South Wales (Episode 5)
Jared Austin, 19, Albany Creek, Queensland (Episode 6)
Ian Kamau, 18, Magill, South Australia (Episode 6)
Elias Tsintzas, 19, Northcote, Victoria (Episode 6)
Julian Zullo, 19, West End, Queensland (Episode 7)
Troy Ruthven, 19, Menai, New South Wales (Episode 7)

Finalists

Devon Gibson, 18, Casuarina, Western Australia
Aaron Turner, 18, Elizabeth Grove, South Australia

Winner

Liam McCormick, 18

See also

List of Australian television series

References

External links
 Official Website
 

2008 Australian television series debuts
2010 Australian television series endings
Fox8 original programming
Association football reality television series
English-language television shows
Australian sports television series
2000s Australian reality television series
A-League Men on television
Television shows set in Sydney
2010s Australian reality television series